Karolina Gruszka (born 13 July 1980) is a Polish actress. She has appeared in more than 30 films and television shows since 1996. She was nominated for an award as Best Actress for her role in Kochankowie z Marony at the 2007 Polish Film Awards.

In 2019, she appeared in the Icelandic movie Gullregn (English: Goldrain), directed by Ragnar Bragason. Although she previously did not know the language, she had to perform all her lines in Icelandic.

Selected filmography
 Keep Away from the Window (2000)
 The Captain's Daughter (2000)
 In August of 1944 (2001)
 Inland Empire (2006)
 3 sezóny v pekle (3 Seasons in Hell) (2009)
 Ivan syn Amira (2013)
 Salvation (Spasene) (2015)
 Marie Curie: The Courage of Knowledge (2016)
 Gullregn (2020)

References

External links

1980 births
Living people
Polish film actresses
20th-century Polish actresses
21st-century Polish actresses